D major (or the key of D) is a major scale based on D, consisting of the pitches D, E, F, G, A, B, and C. Its key signature has two sharps. Its relative minor is B minor and its parallel minor is D minor.

The D major scale is:

Characteristics 

According to Paolo Pietropaolo, D major is Miss Congeniality: it is persistent, sunny,  and energetic.

D major is well-suited to violin music because of the structure of the instrument, which is tuned G D A E. The open strings resonate sympathetically with the D string, producing a sound that is especially brilliant. This is also the case with all other orchestral strings.

Thus, it is no coincidence that many classical composers throughout the centuries have chosen to write violin concertos in D major, including those by Mozart (No. 2, 1775, No. 4, 1775); Ludwig van Beethoven (1806); Paganini (No. 1, 1817); Brahms (1878); Tchaikovsky (1878); Prokofiev (No. 1, 1917); Stravinsky (1931); and Korngold (1945).

The key is also appropriate for guitar music, with drop D tuning making two D's available as open strings. For some beginning wind instrument students, however, D major is not a very suitable key, since it transposes to E major on B wind instruments, and beginning methods generally tend to avoid keys with more than three sharps.

Even so, the clarinet in B is still often used for music in D major, and it is perhaps the sharpest key that is practical for the instrument. There are composers however who, in writing a piece in D minor with B clarinets, will have them change to clarinets in A if the music switches to D major, two examples being Rachmaninoff's Third Piano Concerto and Beethoven's Ninth Symphony in the fourth movement.

The vast majority of tin whistles are in D, since they are often used in music with fiddles. It is a common key for Pub session playing.

History 
In the Baroque period, D major was regarded as "the key of glory"; hence many trumpet concertos were in D major, such as those by Johann Friedrich Fasch, Gross, Molter (No. 2), Leopold Mozart, Telemann (No. 2), and Giuseppe Torelli. Many trumpet sonatas were in D major, too, such as those by Corelli, Petronio Franceschini, Purcell, and Torelli. "The Trumpet Shall Sound" and the "Hallelujah" chorus from Handel's Messiah, and his coronation anthem Zadok the Priest are in D major. In addition, Bach's Mass in B minor has D major as the relative major, and most of the major choruses in this key (Gloria, Cum Sancto Spiritu, Sanctus, Hosanna) make extensive use of trumpets.

23 of Haydn's 104 symphonies are in D major, making it the most-often used main key of his symphonies. The vast majority of Mozart's unnumbered symphonies are in D major, namely K. 66c, 81/73, 97/73m, 95/73n, 120/111a and 161/163/141a. The symphony evolved from the overture, and "D major was by far the most common key for overtures in the second half of the eighteenth century." This continued even into the Romantic Period, and was used for the "triumphant" final movements of several D minor symphonies, including Beethoven's Ninth Symphony, Robert Schumann's Fourth Symphony, the only symphony by César Franck, Sergei Rachmaninoff's First Symphony, and Felix Mendelssohn's Fifth Symphony.

Famous symphonies written in D major include Mozart's symphonies No. 31 (Paris) and No. 38 (Prague), Beethoven's No. 2 Op. 36, Brahms's No. 2 Op. 73, Sibelius's No. 2 Op. 43, and Prokofiev's No. 1 (Classical) Op. 25.

Notable compositions in D major

 Antonio Vivaldi
 Gloria RV 589
 Johann Sebastian Bach
 Brandenburg Concerto No. 5, BWV 1050
 Cello Suite No. 6, BWV 1012
 Orchestral Suite No. 3, BWV 1068
 Orchestral Suite No. 4, BWV 1069
 Magnificat, BWV 243
 Partita No. 4, BWV 828
 Johann Pachelbel
 Canon in D
 George Frideric Handel
 Music for the Royal Fireworks, HWV 351
 Joseph Haydn
Cello Concerto No. 2, Op. 101, Hob. VIIb/2
 String Quartet No. 41, Hob.III:49 ("The Frog")
 String Quartet No. 53, Hob.III:63 ("The Lark")
 String Quartet No. 64, Hob.III:79 ("Largo")
 Symphony No. 86, Hob.I:86
 Symphony No. 96, Hob.I:96 ("The Miracle")
 Symphony No. 101, Hob.I:101 ("The Clock")
 Symphony No. 104, Hob.I:104 ("London")
 Wolfgang Amadeus Mozart
 Symphony No. 8, KV 48
 Symphony No. 20, KV 133
 Symphony No. 30, KV 202
 Symphony No. 31, KV 297 ("Paris")
 Symphony No. 35, KV 385 ("Haffner")
 Symphony No. 38, KV 504 ("Prague")
 Piano Concerto No. 5, KV 175
 Piano Concerto No. 16, KV 451
 Piano Concerto No. 26, KV 537 ("Coronation")
 String Quartet No. 20, KV 499 ("Hoffmeister")
 String Quartet No. 21, KV 575
 String Quintet No. 5, KV 593
 Piano Sonata No. 6, KV 284 ("Dürnitz")
 Piano Sonata No. 9, KV 311
 Piano Sonata No. 18, KV 576
 Sonata in D major for Two Pianos, KV 448
 Ave verum corpus, KV 618
 Ludwig van Beethoven
 Kurfürsten Sonata No. 3 WoO 47/3
 Sonata for piano four-hands, Op. 6
 String Trio No. 2, Op. 8 (as well as the transcription for viola and piano, Op. 42)
 String Trio No. 4, Op. 9/2
 String Quartet No. 3, Op. 18 No. 3
 Serenade for flute, violin and viola Op. 25 (as well as the transcription for flute and piano, Op. 41)
 Violin Sonata No. 1 Op. 12/1
 Piano Sonata No. 7, Op. 10/3
 Piano Sonata No. 15, Op. 28 ("Pastoral")
 Symphony No. 2, Op. 36
 Violin Concerto, Op. 61
 Piano Trio No. 5, Op. 70 No. 1 ("Ghost")
 Variations on a Turkish March Op. 76
 Cello Sonata No. 5, Op. 102/2
 Missa Solemnis, Op. 123
 Franz Schubert
 Symphony No. 1, D. 82
 Symphony No. 3, D. 200
 Symphony No. 10, D 936A
 String Quartet No. 6, D. 74
 String Quartet No. 7, D. 94
 Piano Sonata No. 17, D 850 "Gasteiner"
Felix Mendelssohn
 Symphonies for string orchestra No. 2 and 8
 Variations concertantes for cello and piano, Op. 17
 Calm Sea and Prosperous Voyage, Op. 27
 String Quartet No. 3, Op. 44 No. 1
 Cello Sonata No. 2, Op. 58
 Organ Sonata No. 5, Op. 65 No. 5
 Piano Sextet for piano, violin, two violas, cello and double bass, Op.post. 110
 Frédéric Chopin
 Mazurka, Op. 33 No. 2
 Prelude No. 5, Op. 28 No. 5
 Johannes Brahms
 Hungarian Dance No. 6, WoO 21 
 Serenade No. 1, Op. 11
 Symphony No. 2, Op. 73
 Violin Concerto, Op. 77
 Ballade No. 2 for piano solo, Op. 10/2
 Two sets of variations for piano solo, Op. 21
 Émile Waldteufel
 Estudiantina waltz, Op. 191
 Pyotr Ilyich Tchaikovsky
 String Quartet No. 1, Op. 11
 Symphony No. 3, Op. 29 ("Polish")
 Violin Concerto, Op. 35
 Antonín Dvořák
 Symphony No. 6, B 112 Op. 60
 Czech Suite, B 39 Op. 39
 Slavonic Dance No. 6, B 83 Op. 46
 Gustav Mahler
 Symphony No. 1 "Titan"
 Symphony No. 9 (ends in D-flat major)
 Jean Sibelius
 Symphony No. 2, Op. 43
 The Oceanides, Op. 73
 Ralph Vaughan Williams
 Symphony No. 5 in D major
 Sergei Prokofiev
 Violin Concerto No. 1, Op. 19
 Symphony No. 1, Op. 25 ("Classical")
 Flute Sonata Op. 94 (and the transcription as the Violin Sonata No. 2 Op. 94bis)
 Dmitri Shostakovich
 String Quartet No. 4, Op. 83
 Prelude No. 5, Op. 87 No. 5
 Heitor Villa-Lobos
Étude No. 3 for guitar

See also
Key (music)
Major and minor

References

External links
 

Musical keys
Major scales